Gollejeh or Goljeh or Golojeh may refer to:
 Goljeh, Ardabil
 Gollejeh, Abhar, Zanjan Province
 Goljeh, East Azerbaijan
 Golojeh, Zanjan
 Gollijeh (disambiguation)